The governor of New Mexico is the head of government of New Mexico. The governor is the head of the executive branch of New Mexico's state government and the commander-in-chief of the New Mexico National Guard. As noted in the governor's seal, this gubernatorial office is a scion of the Spanish and Mexican governors of Nuevo México (1598) and the governors of the New Mexico Territory (1851). The officeholder is afforded the courtesy title of The Honorable for life. The current governor is Michelle Lujan Grisham, a Democrat, who was sworn in as the 32nd governor of New Mexico on January 1, 2019.

History
During the occupation of New Mexico by the United States Military starting in 1846, a military governor was appointed to oversee the area; military governors, at times, were assisted by civilian governors. In 1850, New Mexico was organized as a Territory, and the governor was appointed by the President of the United States. The office of governor was created in 1912 when New Mexico was officially admitted to the United States as the 47th state.

Election to the governorship

Requirements to hold office
Section Three of Article V of the New Mexico Constitution establishes the requirements a person must meet in order to become governor. The governor must be a citizen of the United States, be at least 30 years old, and have been a resident of New Mexico for at least five years prior to election.

Term(s) of office
Under Section One of Article V of the New Mexico Constitution, a governor may be elected any number of times, but not more than twice in a row.  Governors serving two consecutive terms are eligible to run again after sitting out one full term.

Relationship with lieutenant governor
The lieutenant governor of New Mexico is elected jointly as the running mate of the gubernatorial candidate in general elections.

Powers
While the governor heads the Executive Branch of the New Mexico state government, the governor does not have absolute power. Other state executives, such as the lieutenant governor, the secretary of state, and the attorney general are also elected to office.

Duties
Responsibilities include making annual State of the State addresses to the New Mexico State Legislature, submitting the budget, and ensuring that state laws are enforced.

Residence
Since 1954, the Governor of New Mexico has resided in the New Mexico Governor's Mansion. Prior to its construction, the governor's residence was located adjacent to the New Mexico State Capitol in downtown Santa Fe. Before 1909, the governor resided in the Palace of the Governors, which is listed as a National Historic Landmark. The Palace of the Governors is the oldest continuously occupied public building in the United States.

Line of succession

According to Section Seven of Article V of the New Mexico Constitution, in the event of the death, resignation, removal, impeachment, absence from the state, failure to qualify, or incapacity due to illness of the governor, the lieutenant governor is the first person in the order of succession and thus serves as governor.

If there is no lieutenant governor, or that person is unable to perform the duties of governor, the Secretary of State serves as governor. If there is no Secretary of State, the President pro Tempore of the Senate serves as governor. If there is no President pro Tempore of the Senate, or if that person is unable to perform the duties of governor, then the Speaker of the House serves as governor.

{| class=wikitable
|-
!#
! Office
! Current officer
|-
!
|align=center|May succeed to governorship
|
|- 
!
|Governor of New Mexico
|Michelle Lujan Grisham
|- 
!1
|Lieutenant Governor of New Mexico
|Howie Morales
|- 
!2
|Secretary of State of New Mexico
|Maggie Toulouse Oliver
|- 
!3
|President Pro Tempore of the Senate
|Mimi Stewart
|- 
!4
|Speaker of the House of Representatives
|Javier Martínez
|-
!
|align=center|May serve as Emergency Interim Successor
|
|- 
!5
|Attorney General of New Mexico
|Raul Torrez
|- 
!6
|State Auditor
| Joseph Maestas
|- 
!7
|State Treasurer
|Laura Montoya
|- 
!8
|Commissioner of Public Lands
|Stephanie Garcia Richard

References

External links
 

 
1912 establishments in New Mexico